Patricio Chapa Elizalde (October 6, 1975) is a Mexican rapper and singer better known by his stage name Pato Machete, he was part of Mexican hip hop group Control Machete.

Discography 
 Mucho Barato... (1996)
 Artillería Pesada presenta (1999)
 Sólo Para Fanáticos (2002)
 Uno, dos:bandera (2003)
 Contrabanda (2008)
 33 (2012)
 Rifa! (2016)

References 

Mexican male rappers
People from Monterrey
People from Nuevo León
1975 births
Living people